Kadrabad  is a village in Kapurthala district of Punjab State, India. The village is administrated by a Sarpanch who is an elected representative of village as per the constitution of India and Panchayati raj (India).

Demography 
According to the report published by Census India in 2011, Kadrabad had 88 houses and a population of 483 (233 males and 250 females). The literacy rate was 65.58%, lower than state average of 75.84%. The number of children under the age of 6 years was 53 (10.97% of the population) and the child sex ratio was approximately 893, higher than the state average of 846.

Population data

Air travel connectivity 
The closest airport to the village is Sri Guru Ram Dass Jee International Airport.

See also
List of villages in Kapurthala

References

External links
  Villages in Kapurthala
 Kapurthala Villages List

Villages in Kapurthala district